Bogdanci is a municipality in the southern part of North Macedonia. Bogdanci is also the name of the town where the municipal seat is found. Bogdanci Municipality is part of Southeastern Statistical Region.

Geography
The municipality borders Dojran Municipality to the east, Valandovo Municipality to the north, Gevgelija Municipality to the west, and Greece to the south.

Demographics

According to the last national census from 2021 this municipality has 7,339 inhabitants. Ethnic groups in the municipality include:

References

External links
 Official website

 
Southeastern Statistical Region
Municipalities of North Macedonia